Industrial War: The Agony and the Ecstasy of Industrial Music is a various artists compilation album released on March 3, 1997, released by Shanachie Records.

Reception
Industrial Reviews gave Industrial War: The Agony and the Ecstasy of Industrial Music a rating of two out of five stars and criticized the collection for being indistinctive and unremarkable.

Track listing

Personnel
Adapted from the Industrial War: The Agony and the Ecstasy of Industrial Music liner notes.

 Wagner Bucci – production
 Sharon Maher – assistant production
 Steve Mannion – cover art, illustrations, design
 Joan Pelosi – design

Release history

References

External links 
 Industrial War: The Agony and the Ecstasy of Industrial Music at Discogs (list of releases)

1997 compilation albums
Shanachie Records compilation albums